Robin Marie Corsiglia (born August 12, 1962), later known by her married name Robin Scholefield, is a former competitive swimmer from Canada.

She represented Canada as a 13 year old at the 1976 Summer Olympics in Montreal, Quebec. Corsiglia won a bronze medal swimming the breaststroke leg of the women's 4x100-metre medley relay, together with her Canadian teammates Wendy Hogg (backstroke), Susan Sloan (butterfly), and Anne Jardin (freestyle).  Individually, she also competed in the women's 100-metre breaststroke, finishing fourth in the event final.

Corsiglia attended the University of Southern California, and swam for the USC Trojans swimming and diving team.

She received her Phd in Clinical Psychology (1999) from the California School of Professional Psychology, Los Angeles and is a married mother of three and a sports psychologist at the University of Southern California - University Park Health Center in Los Angeles.

See also
 List of Olympic medalists in swimming (women)

References 

1962 births
Living people
People from Kirkland, Quebec
Canadian female breaststroke swimmers
Commonwealth Games gold medallists for Canada
Olympic bronze medalists for Canada
Olympic bronze medalists in swimming
Olympic swimmers of Canada
Swimmers at the 1976 Summer Olympics
Swimmers at the 1978 Commonwealth Games
Swimmers at the 1979 Pan American Games
USC Trojans women's swimmers
Medalists at the 1976 Summer Olympics
Commonwealth Games medallists in swimming
California School of Professional Psychology alumni
Pan American Games competitors for Canada
20th-century Canadian women
Medallists at the 1978 Commonwealth Games